This list is of the Natural Monuments of Japan within the Metropolis of Tōkyō.

National Natural Monuments
As of 1 April 2021, forty-five Natural Monuments have been designated, including six *Special Natural Monuments.

Metropolitan Natural Monuments
As of 1 May 2020, sixty-two Natural Monuments have been designated at a prefectural (metropolitan) level.

Municipal Natural Monuments
As of 1 May 2020, one hundred and ninety-seven Natural Monuments have been designated at a municipal level.

See also
 Cultural Properties of Japan
 Parks and gardens in Tokyo
 List of Places of Scenic Beauty of Japan (Tōkyō)
 List of Historic Sites of Japan (Tōkyō)
 Extinct: Bonin wood pigeon, Bonin thrush, Bonin grosbeak, Bonin nankeen night heron, Iwo Jima rail, Mukojima white-eye, Sturdee's pipistrelle

References

External links
  Cultural Properties in Tōkyō
  Cultural Properties in Tōkyō

 Tokyo
Tokyo